Jeremy Ian Monteiro (born 20 June 1960, Singapore) is a Singaporean jazz pianist, singer, composer, and music educator. In Singapore he was mentioned by the local press as Singapore's "King of Swing". Monteiro was awarded the Cultural Medallion (in the Music category) by the National Arts Council, Singaporein 2002.

Career 
In 2021, Monteiro was elected chairman of Compass (Composers and Authors Society of Singapore).

Monteiro was also the executive director and music director of the Jazz Association (Singapore).

Personal life 
Monteiro was drawn to the spontaneity of jazz and turned professional at the age of 16. 

Monteiro has two sisters, Sheila and Claressa, the latter a professional jazz singer.

Discography
 Always in Love (J.J. Jazz, 1990)
 Songs My Dad Taught Me (First Impression Music, 1997)
 Live at the Montreux Jazz Festival with Redd Holt, Eldee Young (J.J. Jazz, 2001)
 A Song for You, Karen (First Impression Music, 2002)
 Singapore Swing (2009)
 Jazz-Blues Brothers (Verve Records, 2014)
 To Paris With Love: A Tribute to the Genius of Michel Legrand with Eugene Pao (Jazznote, 2015)
 Live at No Black Tie Kuala Lumpur with Jay Anderson and Lewis Nash (Jazznote Records, 2021)
 Jazz-Blues Brothers (Jazznote Records, 2021)

References

External links
 Official site
 YouTube Channel

1960 births
Jazz composers
Living people
Singaporean composers
Singaporean jazz musicians
Singaporean pianists
20th-century Singaporean male singers
Academics of the University of West London
Recipients of the Cultural Medallion
Saint Joseph's Institution, Singapore alumni
Male pianists
21st-century pianists
Male jazz composers
21st-century Singaporean male singers